Alejandro González Alcocer (born April 24, 1951) is a Mexican politician and lawyer, belonging to the National Action Party (PAN).

After Alcocer studied law at Universidad Nacional Autónoma de México (UNAM), he began his career in companies in the private sector, and later entered politics, where he served as Secretario del Ayuntamiento of Tijuana, and later as a federal deputy (diputado federal) in the 56th Federal Legislature. González Alcocer is the son of Manuel González Hinojosa, national head of the PAN  in the 1960s and 70s.

On October 7, 1998, he was named Substitute Governor of Baja California upon the death of governor Héctor Terán Terán.

He was elected to the Senate, representing Baja California, for the period between 2006–2012.

See also
Governor of Baja California
Baja California

External links
 The biography of Alejandro González Alcocer as Governor of Baja California

Living people
Governors of Baja California
National Action Party (Mexico) politicians
Members of the Chamber of Deputies (Mexico)
Members of the Senate of the Republic (Mexico)
Politicians from Mexico City
1951 births
21st-century Mexican politicians
National Autonomous University of Mexico alumni
20th-century Mexican politicians
20th-century Mexican lawyers